Eupithecia chalikophila is a moth in the family Geometridae. It is found in Spain and North Africa.

References

Moths described in 1926
chalikophila
Moths of Europe
Moths of Africa